The Boys Presents: Diabolical, also simply known as The Boys: Diabolical or Diabolical, is an American adult animated superhero anthology series that premiered on Amazon Prime Video on March 4, 2022. It serves as a spin-off of the live action television series The Boys, and is similarly based on the comic book series of the same name by Garth Ennis and Darick Robertson. The series is created by Eric Kripke, Seth Rogen and Evan Goldberg, all executive producers of The Boys television series, alongside Simon Racioppa.

Every episode serves as a stand-alone story set in the universe of the live action series; the tone of the stories can vary from fully comedic to fully dramatic, and each has its own animation style. Writers for the series include Ennis, Racioppa, Rogen, Goldberg, Justin Roiland, Ilana Glazer, Awkwafina, and Andy Samberg; featured voice actors include Antony Starr, Dominique McElligott, Chace Crawford, Elisabeth Shue, and Giancarlo Esposito, all reprising their roles from the live action series.

Diabolical received critical acclaim upon release with praise going to the animation, voice acting, writing, humor and themes.

Premise
A series of animated shorts telling side stories in the universe of The Boys using various animation styles.

Episodes

Production
At the 2021 CCXP Worlds panel for Prime Video in Brazil, The Boys Presents: Diabolical was first announced. It was revealed to be an animated anthology series set in The Boys universe, with executive producers Seth Rogen and Evan Goldberg likening it to The Animatrix. Diabolical is made up of eight brand new stories created by Awkwafina, Garth Ennis, Eliot Glazer and Ilana Glazer, Evan Goldberg and Seth Rogen, Simon Racioppa, Justin Roiland and Ben Bayouth, Andy Samberg, and Aisha Tyler. The series premiered on March 4, 2022.

Eric Kripke stated that the idea to create Diabolical arose during the COVID-19 pandemic, when the producers wanted to release something during the wait for season three of The Boys.  Due to the restrictions on most live-action productions, they decided to try and make an animated anthology utilizing different forms and styles.

Several key cast members were revealed with the first teaser trailer in February 2022, which included several of the creators. Later that month, a full trailer with the rest of the large cast was revealed.  This included the revelation that Pegg would provide the voice of Hughie Campbell, a character who was long associated with Pegg; however, Pegg could not portray him in live action, having aged too much by the time the series was produced.

Eric Kripke later clarified that the show's production crew only considered 3 episodes to be canon despite the entire show being advertised as such. These are: Nubian vs Nubian, John and Sun-Hee and One Plus One Equals Two. I'm Your Pusher is further set in the universe of the comics.

Reception
On review aggregator website Rotten Tomatoes, the series holds a 97% approval rating based on 34 reviews, with an average rating of 7.6/10. The website's critics consensus reads, "Diabolicals animated shorts pack the same supersized punch as The Boys, transposing the original series' scabrous social commentary into a cartoonish medium that's just as much devilish fun–and definitely not for kids." Metacritic, which uses a weighted average, assigned a score of 70 out of 100 based on 7 critics, indicating "generally favorable reviews".

Accolades

References

External links
 

Diabolical
2020s American adult animated television series
2020s American anthology television series
2022 American television series debuts
2022 American television series endings
Adult animated television shows based on DC Comics
Amazon Prime Video original programming
Animated television series by Amazon Studios
American adult animation anthology series
American adult animated comedy television series
American adult animated drama television series
American adult animated superhero television series
American adult animated television spin-offs
Anime-influenced Western animated television series
Dynamite Entertainment adaptations
English-language television shows
Television shows based on comics
Television series by Amazon Studios
Television series by Sony Pictures Television